Schauenburg is a municipality in the district of Kassel, in Hesse, Germany. It currently consists of 5 villages: 
Elgershausen, Hoof, Breitenbach, Martinhagen and Elmshagen, with Elgershausen being the largest and Elmshagen the smallest. The municipal administration is located in Hoof.

References

Kassel (district)